The 1898 Colorado Silver and Gold football team was an American football team that represented the University of Colorado as a member of the Colorado Football Association (CFA) during the 1898 college football season. Led by fourth-year head coach Fred Folsom, Colorado compiled an overall record of 4–4 with a mark of 0–2 in conference play, finishing last out of three teams in the CFA.

Schedule

References

Colorado
Colorado Buffaloes football seasons
Colorado Silver and Gold football